The Lazarus Child (entitled The Last Door in Canada) is a 2004 American horror film directed by Graham Theakston. It was filmed in Canada and the United Kingdom.

Plot
The film covers the lives of a family after their young daughter is severely injured in a car crash. It is based on a book written in 1998 by the journalist Robert Mawson as his second novel. The plot revolves around the controversial but highly humane treatment of the traffic accident victim who is in a deep coma and can only be brought back to consciousness with the help of her older brother and a gifted neurologist doctor whose work is not recognised by the community. The consequences of this lack of understanding nearly wreck the healing process.

Cast
 Andy García as Jack Heywood
 Frances O'Connor as Alison Heywood 
 Angela Bassett as Dr. Elizabeth Chase
 Harry Eden as Ben Heywood
 Geraldine McEwan as Janet
 Danielle Byrnes as Frankie Heywood
 Jaimz Woolvett as Nathan Greenwater

References

External links
 
 
 

2004 films
2004 drama films
Morgan Creek Productions films
Warner Bros. films
Films with screenplays by Ronald Bass
American drama films
2000s English-language films
2000s American films